Athyroglossa glaphyropus is a species of shore flies in the family Ephydridae.

Distribution
United States, Neotropical.

References

Ephydridae
Taxa named by Hermann Loew
Diptera of North America
Insects described in 1878